Lindau (Lindau am Bodensee; ; Low Alemannic: Lindou) is a major town and island on the eastern side of Lake Constance (Bodensee in German) in Bavaria, Germany. It is the capital of the county (Landkreis) of Lindau, Bavaria and is near the borders of the Austrian state of Vorarlberg and the Swiss cantons of St. Gallen and Thurgau. The coat of arms of Lindau town is a linden tree, referring to the supposed origin of the town's name (Linde means linden tree in German). The historic town of Lindau is located on the  island of the same name which is connected with the mainland by a road bridge and a railway causeway leading to Lindau station.

History 

The first use of the name Lindau was documented in 882 by a monk from St. Gallen, stating that Adalbert (count of Raetia) had founded a nunnery on the island. However the remains of an early Roman settlement dating back to the 1st century have been found in the district of Aeschach.

In 1180, St. Stephan's church was founded. In 1224 the Franciscans founded a monastery on the island. In 1274/75 Lindau became an Imperial Free City under King Rudolf I.

In 1430, about 15 of Lindau's Jews were burned at the stake after being accused of murdering a Christian child. In 1528, Lindau accepted the Protestant Reformation, following the Tetrapolitan Confession at first and subsequently the Augsburg Confession. In 1655, after the Thirty Years' War, the first Lindauer Kinderfest (children's festival) was held, in memory of the war. This festival, introduced by Councillor Valentin Heider, still makes up an important part of the town's identity.

Lindau lost its status as an Imperial Free City in 1802, after the dissolution of the Holy Roman Empire. The city went to Karl August von Bretzenheim who gave Lindau and the monastery to the Austrian Empire in 1804. In 1805 Austria returned Lindau to Bavaria.

In 1853 a causeway was built to connect the railway from Munich to the island. In 1856 a new harbour was built, with its characteristic landmarks, the lion sculpture and Bavaria's only lighthouse.

In 1922 the independent districts of Aeschach, Hoyren and Reutin merged with the Lindau district. After World War II, Lindau fell under French administration and went firstly to Württemberg-Hohenzollern and then to the State of Baden-Württemberg. In 1955, Lindau again returned to Bavaria.

Lindau is located near the meeting point of the Austrian, German and Swiss borders and is nestled on the lake in front of Austria's Pfänder mountain. Lindau is popular with sightseers and holidaymakers for its medieval town centre and picturesque location on Lake Constance. The Nobel Laureate Meetings at Lindau began in 1951 and bring many Nobel Prize laureates to Lindau each year.

Tourist attractions 

Lindau is a popular tourist attraction in the South of Germany. The gardens of Lindau are best in spring or summer blossom and summer is the peak tourist period. Lindau is famous for its architecture and outdoor attractions such as cycling, sailing, hiking, swimming and camping are also popular.

 Harbour entrance with lighthouse and Bavarian Lion sculpture (Island of Lindau)
 Church of St. Stephan (Evangelical Church), c. 1180 with remodelling in 1782
 Church of St. Peter (founded about 1000), became a war memorial church in 1928 
 Minster 'Unserer Lieben Frau' former church of the monastery 'Maria Himmelfahrt' (which is German for Assumption of Mary), with St. Marien (Stiftskirche) 
 Maximilianstraße (main street through the Island of Lindau with shops and restaurants)
 Historic Town Hall
 Casino Spielbank Lindau
 Gardens and Parks of Lindau, e.g. Lindenhofpark
 Museum 'Haus zum Cavazzen'
 Theatre Lindau 
 Boat trips by Bodenseeschifffahrt
 Lindau's Old Book Archive (ERB – Ehemals Reichsstädtische Bibliothek) with books from the 15th to 18th century inside the historic town hall 
 Hoyerberg near Hoyerberg Schlössle is a scenic lookout with views of the surrounding area

Economy 

Historically, the trading route from Nuremberg to Italy passed through Lindau; fishery has also played a big role in the economy of the city and in the 19th century, Lindau was an important location for textile industries. Tourism (including restaurants and accommodation) and industrial production are the main industries in contemporary Lindau. Lindau has a very low unemployment rate, likely the result of a diverse economy and proximity to the Alpine Rhine Valley.

Larger corporations 
 Lindauer Dornier (Textile machines)
 Liebherr Electronics
 Cooper-Standard Automotive (former Metzeler Automotive Profile Systems)
 Cofely Refrigeration (former Axima Refrigeration, which was former Sulzer Escher-Wyss, a refrigeration and air conditioning plant)
 Continental AG, BU ADAS (ADC Automotive Distance Control GmbH)
 Faurecia Automotive (former Angell-Demmel GmbH)
 Crane Co. ChemPharm Energy (former Xomox GmbH now part of Crane)

Other local economy 
 Numerous farms around town, producing apples, pears, strawberries and related products e.g. Schnapps, wine or fruit juices.
 Local hairdressers, gyms, bakeries, butchers, ice cream and coffee shops
 Variety of car dealers (major VW, BMW and Renault with subsidies to other car makes), petrol stations, etc.
 Care homes, Hospital

Districts 

Lindau is split into several districts. A search for 'Lindau Stadt' will reveal the town's bordering to the neighbour parts of Lindau.
 Central: Island, Aeschach
 East: Reutin, Zech
 West: Bad Schachen, Unterreitnau
 North: Oberreitnau, Hochbuch, Hoyern, Schönau

Transport

Railway 
Lindau-Insel station is Lindau's main station and is located on Lindau Island, however the station has been complemented by the development of Lindau-Reutin station in the Reutin district on the mainland, which was opened in 2020. Lindau-Insel station has trains to and from Friedrichshafen, Munich, Ulm, Augsburg and Bregenz.

Bus – Stadtbus Lindau 
Lindau's bus system is called Stadtbus Lindau, which departs from all stations every 30 minutes and runs until 22.30 daily, with special services for events. The bus system is run by the main local utility provider Stadtwerke Lindau.

Additionally RBA and the Zweiländer-line of Austrias "Landbus Unterland" also operate from Lindau. Recently long-distance coaches have started running to distant German cities, an alternative to Deutsche Bahn trains.

Road
Lindau is connected to the Autobahn A96 (E43). Main roads (German Bundesstraße) include B31 and B12. The A96 links to the Austrian Autobahn A14 starting right after the joining with the 7 km long Pfändertunnel. The tunnel has been expanded into 4 lane, 2 tunnel road which was opened in 2013 to accommodate increased north–south traffic.

Airports
Lindau does not have its own airport, however is close to Friedrichshafen Airport and Memmingen Airport, which usually serve tourist arrivals and European destinations. The nearest major airports are Munich Airport, Stuttgart Airport or Zurich Airport.

Utilities 
Lindau's local utility provider is called Stadtwerke Lindau. Stadtwerke Lindau provides electricity, water, telecommunications, public baths, and some other services to Lindau.

Telecommunications
The local utility provider Stadtwerke TK-Lindau has started deploying fibre-optic internet to major businesses, and new housing development areas. Other networks include cable television by Kabel Deutschland, which is available in some streets and xDSL, by many providers. Some systems have seen upgrades of the ADSL standard in the last years to cope with the high bandwidth demand. There are plans to deploy a WiFi hotspot network (or WLAN, as it is more commonly known in German) across the Island of Lindau.

Property, redevelopment, and other major projects
Lindau is currently planning several redevelopment projects across the city. The following is a list of projects that are planned for redevelopment.
 New train station – Lindau has been planning a new train station for many years. Currently there is agreement between the major stakeholders is to build a new station near the shopping mall Lindaupark (Reutin district) and refurbish the station on the island. Both stations will remain active. 
Electrification of the Train tracks to Munich (connecting Munich and Zürich) – this major project is sponsored by large external stakeholders such as the State of Bavaria, Switzerland and Deutsche Bahn.
Lindau Inselhalle – Lindau's main hall which is used for conferences is due to be rebuilt soon.
Multi-storey car park – related to the redevelopment of Lindau Inselhalle on the island
 Property developments near the train station on the island are planned, after rail tracks have been removed
 A New Fire station was completed in September 2014 near Auenstraße (outside the island) – a major headquarters for all the former stations across town, including the Technisches Hilfswerk (THW) unit of Lindau.
Property developments connected to area which belongs to Deutsche Bahn near Reutin, once the new train station is completed
Property developments in Aeschach district – including some major buildings, including luxury apartments and offices
Railway underpass near the entrance of the island – Lindau is planning two railway underpasses for cars to ease congestion, partly caused by tourists visiting by car causing frequent crossing closures
Several company extensions or relocations are planned – as of September 2014 Continental AG is extending into a third office complex
Lindau Utility is deploying optical broadband across the city
Lindau Strandbad, the major public bath is in discussion of being refurbished
Major redevelopment of REWE Supermarket in Bodolz – New interior, new shops. It will be closed from December 2014 until April 2015

Local news sources 
Lindau has a well established newspaper called Lindauer Zeitung, which is part of the Schwäbische Zeitung, which is released daily. Another newspaper is the Bürgerzeitung Lindau (BZ) which is released by the city council. It is released biweekly and contains announcements to the town by the mayor and local news. The paper is free, sponsored by advertisements and can usually be found in shops. Both newspapers are available in print and online.

Schools and kindergartens 
Lindau has two main high schools: Bodensee-Gymnasium and Valentin-Heider-Gymnasium. With one middle school for girls (Maria-Ward-Realschule Lindau) and one middle school for boys (Staatliche Realschule für Knaben Lindau) there are several primary schools across the town. Lindau recently completed construction of a new Kindergarten, which also included a Kita Kindertagestätte, which is a baby nursery for children aged 2–3. There is high demand for childcare in Lindau and providers are obliged by the State of Bavaria to provide for every child.

Hospitals, civic offices
 Asklepios Krankenhaus Lindau 
 Bürgerbüro Lindau , the local office for all legal matters, e.g. passports, registration, etc. 
 KFZ-Zulassungsstelle, registration office for cars
 Finanzamt (tax office), location in Lindau

Shopping 
Lindau's large shopping centres and supermarkets like Aldi, Lidl, REWE are off Lindau Island. However, the Island has many different shops, which sell clothing, cosmetics, gifts, toys, antique items and local products such as cheese and wine. Lindau's main shopping mall is called Lindaupark and hosts larger shops such as Müller Drogerie and a supermarket.

Festivals and events 
Thanks to its location on Lake Constance, Lindau hosts a number of festivals and events, usually in summer (between May and August). 
 U&D, Umsonst & Draussen by Club Vaudeville Lindau. The festival hosts live music in a public area.
 Nobel Laureate Meetings at Lindau, Lindau's prestigious science event. Students from all over the world are able to meet up with Nobel laureates to discuss scientific developments. Lindau is soon to build a new conference home for this event.
 Psychotherapiewochen, a psychologist conference
 Rund Um den Bodensee, a sailing competition
 Gartentage 2014
Lindauer Oktoberfest
 Lindauer Kinderfest

Notable people 
 Achilles Gasser, also Gasserus (1505–1577), physician and historian
Jacob Ernst Thomann von Hagelstein (1588–1653), painter
Johann Jacob Heber (1666–1727), surveyor and geometrician
Richard Z. Johnson, American attorney and politician (died in Lindau)
 John Spilman (died 1626), paper manufacturer and jeweler in England

Genealogy 
Lindau is believed to be the origin of the Lindauer surname of Germany, Switzerland, Alsace-Lorraine, Austria and the Czech Republic. A Jewish family bearing this name is said to have descended from Suskind of Lindau, who was among those killed during the pogrom of 1430.

Lindauer is also the name of a famous wine brand from New Zealand, however there is no established relationship between Lindau and the wine, which is named after painter Gottfried Lindauer.

Gastronomy

Lindau produces a number of local wines and beverages, there are a number of localities that produce wines (Rädlewirtschaften) from local vineyards and Schnapps made by local farmers.

Climate 

Lindau is located in a temperate climatic zone (experiencing four distinct seasons) with mountain surroundings and the freshwater lake. Winters can be cold, with temperatures reaching as low as −20 °C on occasion. In some exceptional cases, winters can be so severely cold that major parts of the lake freeze, making crossing of the lake by car possible, however this is a once in 50 to 100 year event. Summers are normally warm to hot and usually humid due to the surrounding lake.

Heavy storms, rain showers and thunderstorms are common in summer and heavy winds up to 8 on the Beaufort scale are possible. Usually the lake is calm; however, there is a warning light system for boats to indicate if heavy storms are forecast. Due to the surrounding mountains, snow is always in sight and a good indicator of weather. Lake Constance is located at roughly 400m above sea level.

Twin towns

Lindau is twinned with:
  Serpukhov (Russia)
  Chelles (France) Lindau was twinned in 1964 with the City of Chelles in France, which was initiated by the returned French soldiers after World War II.
  Reitnau (Switzerland)

References

External links 

 
 Free Pictures Lindau
 A Week with Nobel Laureates at Lindau, free video from the Vega Science Trust
 Interviews with Nobel Laureates at Lindau, free videos from the Vega Science Trust
 Lindau photo gallery
 Lindau Tourism Information
Landkreis Lindau

Populated places on Lake Constance
Free imperial cities
Lake islands of Germany
Lindau (district)
Islands of Lake Constance in Germany
Islands of Bavaria